The Emden Außenhafen station (Emden outer harbor) is a harbor station of the East Frisian city of Emden in Lower Saxony, Germany. It is a terminus for InterCity and regional trains.

Location and structure
The station has one platform track, along with several sidings, among them some of Niedersachsen Ports GmbH & Co KG. The station serves as a feeder for the ferry to Borkum and is therefore located in the immediate vicinity of the Borkumkai of the Emden harbor.

The harbor station is connected via a single-track branch line with the Emden main station. All trains going from Leer to the Emden Außenhafen station have to change direction in the main station.

In June 2006, extensive modernization of the station and the track were completed, which is since then also provided with overhead line, so that electric trains can go to the harbor station. Also a new terminal for the change to the ferry was erected then.

References

Railway stations in Lower Saxony
Buildings and structures in Emden
Railway stations serving harbours and ports